Deenar Nagar is a small town in Kasaragod district, Kerala, India. Deenar Nagar is located about 3 km inwards to Bandiyod, a small town between Kasaragod and Mangalore. It is around 19.7 km north to the Kasaragod town and 39 km south to Mangalore.

Sports 

Football and cricket are given major importance in Deenar Nagar. Other sports like volleyball and gori are also played there.

Dilkush Stadium is one of the best in the area and one of the oldest football clubs in the Kasaragod district.

Victory Arts & Sports Club (VASC) Deenar Nagar is one of the oldest clubs, established in 1951 which is prominent in football, cricket & volleyball.

Mosques 

Muhiyuddeen Jumah Masjid is the only mosque in Deenar Nagar.

Transport

Air 
The nearest airport to Deenar Nagar is Mangalore International Airport, which is around 44.8 km away from the town. Kannur International Airport, which is 141 km from the town is under construction. Other airports near Deenar Nagar is Calicut International Airport, lies about 223 km to the south and Mysore Airport, which is around 259 km to the south east.

Road 
Deenar Nagar Bus Station is the only bus station in Deenar Nagar. Private buses are servicing through Deenar Nagar on regular intervals.

Schools and education 
Malandoor UP school is situated in Deenar Nagar and is controlled by Kerala Government. There are other few schools nearby like Kunil Education Trust, AJI English Medium School, Shihab English Medium School, Uppala Government School, Meepiry Government School and Ichlangod Government School.

Languages
This locality is an essentially multi-lingual region. The people speak Malayalam, Kannada, Tulu, Beary bashe and Konkani. Migrant workers also speak Hindi and Tamil languages. This village is part of Manjeswaram assembly constituency which is again part of Kasaragod (Lok Sabha constituency)

Infrastructure

Garden City Auditorium 
Regions only Auditorium is under construction which is to be completed by 2016. Garden City Auditorium can accommodate around 2000-3000 people and can be used for the occasions like Wedding, Cultural Activities, Meetings etc.

References

Manjeshwar area